The H[onourable] C[ompany's] S[hip] Comet was launched in 1798 by the Bombay Dockyard. She was a brig belonging to the British East India Company's naval arm, the Bombay Marine. She foundered without a trace in late 1800 or early 1801.

In October 1800  struck on the Perates, in the South China Sea some 300 miles to the southeast of Hong Kong, during a gale. She foundered with the loss of all her passengers and crew, who numbered some 150 persons.  was  sailing from China to Bombay when she sighted the wreckage. Houghton reported the loss at Bombay. 

In December the EIC sent two vessels, Captain George Roper, and Comet, Lieutenant William Henr)y, from Bombay to the Paracel Islands to search for the cause of Earl Talbots loss and to pick up any possible survivors. In February 1802 reports had reached London that although the two vessels had made many discoveries relating to natural history and geography, and had seen wreckage of other vessels on uninhabited islands, they had found nothing further concerning Lord Eldon. 

The two vessels were still listed on the establishment of the Bombay Marine as of 1 January 1802. However, by 1803, there was a recognition that both Intrepid and Comet had disappeared without a trace. They were presumed to have foundered at sea.

Citations and references
Citations

References
 
 
  
 

1798 ships
British ships built in India
Missing ships
Warships lost with all hands
Ships of the British East India Company